Bradford & Bingley Rugby Football Club is an English rugby union team based in Bingley, West Yorkshire. The club runs four senior sides, including a veterans side, and eleven junior teams. The first XV plays in North 1 East.

Bumble Bee Barbarians
Bradford & Bingley RFC is home of the Bumble Bee Barbarians, England's first mixed ability rugby team. Founded in 2009 by a determined young man with Cerebral Palsy and Learning Difficulties the team now has over 30 players. In August 2015 the first ever mixed ability World Cup tournament with take place at their home ground at Wagon Lane

History
The club was formed in 1982 following a merger between Bingley RFC and Bradford RFC.

Club honours
North 1 East champions (3): 1988–89, 1998–99, 2002–03
North 1 champions (2): 1992–93, 2003–04
RFU Intermediate Cup winners: 2004
National League 3 North champions: 2005–06
Yorkshire 1 champions: 2015–16

Notes

References

External links
Official website

English rugby union teams
Rugby clubs established in 1982
Sport in Bradford
1982 establishments in England